The 2021 Saint-Tropez Open was a professional tennis tournament played on hard courts. It was the first edition of the tournament which was part of the 2021 ATP Challenger Tour. It took place in Saint-Tropez, France between 30 August and 5 September 2021.

Singles main-draw entrants

Seeds

 1 Rankings are as of 23 August 2021.

Other entrants
The following players received wildcards into the singles main draw:
  Arthur Cazaux
  Valentin Royer
  Luca Van Assche

The following players received entry into the singles main draw as alternates:
  JC Aragone
  Manuel Guinard
  Kyrian Jacquet
  Constant Lestienne
  Wu Tung-lin

The following players received entry from the qualifying draw:
  Dan Added
  Bogdan Bobrov
  Jurgen Briand
  Alexis Galarneau

The following players received entry as lucky losers:
  Daniil Glinka
  Maxime Hamou
  Dragoș Nicolae Mădăraș

Champions

Singles

  Benjamin Bonzi def.  Christopher O'Connell 6–7(10–12), 6–1, 0–0 ret.

Doubles

  Antonio Šančić /  Artem Sitak def.  Romain Arneodo /  Manuel Guinard 7–6(7–5), 6–4.

References

2021 ATP Challenger Tour
2021 in French sport
August 2021 sports events in France
September 2021 sports events in France